Kuybyshev is a town in Novosibirsk Oblast, Russia, located on the Om River (Irtysh's tributary),  west of Novosibirsk, the administrative center of the oblast. Population:    40,000 (1970).

History
It was founded as a military fort named Kainsky Pas in 1722. On January 30, 1782, it was granted town status and renamed Kainsk. In 1804, it became a part of Tomsk Governorate. In 1935, it was renamed Kuybyshev after Valerian Kuybyshev, who was exiled to Kainsk in 1907 and lived here for two years.

Administrative and municipal status
Within the framework of administrative divisions, Kuybyshev serves as the administrative center of Kuybyshevsky District, even though it is not a part of it. As an administrative division, it is incorporated separately as the Town of Kuybyshev—an administrative unit with the status equal to that of the districts. As a municipal division, the Town of Kuybyshev is incorporated within Kuybyshevsky Municipal District as Kuybyshev Urban Settlement.

References

Notes

Sources

External links
Unofficial website of Kuybyshev 

Cities and towns in Novosibirsk Oblast
Tomsk Governorate